Tauren O'lander Strickland (born January 10, 1986), known professionally as Strick, is an American rapper and singer. He is
signed to Young Thug's YSL Records, 300 Entertainment, and Atlantic Records.

Early life and career 
Strick was born on January 10, 1986, in High Point, North Carolina, but raised, grew up and lived in Atlanta, Georgia. He enlisted in the United States Air Force after attending universities at High Point University, and Emory University. In 2016, he began working closely with producer TM88. That year, Strick co-wrote four songs on TM88, Wiz Khalifa, and Juicy J's collaborative album Rude Awakening, "Ballin" by Juicy J, and "Coordinate" by Travis Scott, from Scott's Platinum album Birds in the Trap Sing McKnight.

In 2017, Strick released the single "100 Degrees" featuring Young Thug. That same year, he released the mixtape risk=reward. The followup mixtape, risk=reward 2, was released in 2018. That same year, he featured on Young Thug's song "STS" from the Young Stoner Life Records album Slime Language. He officially signed to YSL Records/300 Entertainment in October 2018. In January 2019, he released the EP See You When I Land. In June, he released the compilation album The Machine, Vol. 1. In July 2020, he released the single "Yacht Club" with Young Thug and Ty Dolla $ign, which ended up being the lead single to his debut studio album Strick Land.

In the summer of 2022, Strick accompanied American musician Kid Cudi on his To the Moon World Tour as a opening act.

Discography

Albums 
 Strick Land (2021)

Mixtapes 
 risk=reward (2017)
 risk=reward 2 (2018)
 See You When I Land (2019)
 The Machine Vol. 1 (2019)
 The Machine Vol. 2 (2019)
 The Machine Vol. 3 (2022)

EPs 
 2LATE 2APOLOGIZE (2022)

Songwriting credits 
Credits adapted from BMI.

Concert tours

Headlining

Supporting
 Kid Cudi – To The Moon Tour (2022)

References

External links 
 Official website

Living people
American rappers
1986 births